Titus Pomponius Atticus (November 110 BC – 31 March 32 BC; later named Quintus Caecilius Pomponianus Atticus) was a Roman editor, banker, and patron of letters, best known for his correspondence and close friendship with prominent Roman statesman Marcus Tullius Cicero. Atticus was from a wealthy Roman family of the equestrian class (lower aristocratic non-ruling class) and from the Pomponia gens.

Biography

Early life
Born Titus Pomponius in Rome , Atticus descended from a family of equestrian rank and was the son of Titus Pomponius and Caecilia. He had a sister named Pomponia. Growing up, he studied and developed close friendships with Cicero, Lucius Manlius Torquatus, and Gaius Marius the Younger. He is said to have been an excellent student, and in 85 BC, Atticus moved to Athens to further his education, particularly in philosophy. His love of Athens inspired his self-appointed nickname "Atticus", or "Man of Attica", which is mentioned in the fifth book of Cicero's  (section 4). During his visit to Athens, Julius Caesar was Atticus's guest.

Career
Atticus inherited family money, which he successfully invested in real estate, enhancing his wealth. Using his income to support his love of letters, he had trained Roman slaves as scribes and taught them to make papyrus scrolls, allowing Atticus to publish, amongst other things, the works of his friend Cicero. His editions of Greek authors such as Plato, Demosthenes, and Aeschines were prized for their accuracy in the ancient world. None of Atticus's own writings have survived, but he is known to have written one book (in Ancient Greek) on Cicero's consulship, the Liber Annalis (a work on Roman chronology), and a small amount of Roman poetry.

In 65 BC, Atticus returned from Athens to Rome. In keeping with his Epicurean sympathies, he kept out of politics to the greatest extent possible, except to lend Cicero a helping hand in times of peril — for instance, when Cicero was forced to flee the country in 49 BC, Atticus made him a present of 250,000 sesterces.  All in all, his political activity was minimal, though we know that, like Cicero, he belonged to the optimates (the aristocratic party), and held generally conservative views. He was also a partner of the Triumvir Marcus Licinius Crassus.

Upon the death of his wealthiest maternal uncle Quintus Caecilius, Atticus became his adopted son and heir, assuming the name Quintus Caecilius Pomponianus Atticus. Lucius Licinius Lucullus, despite being his personal friend, resented Atticus's receiving an inheritance he felt he was entitled to for his association with the campaign against Mithridates and as Governor of Syria.

Atticus was friendly with the Liberators after the assassination of Julius Caesar but was not harmed following their defeat. According to Cornelius Nepos, he took care of Servilia after the death of her son Brutus at the Battle of Philippi.

Marriage and children 

In his later years, he married a relative, Pilia ( – 46 BC), daughter of Pilius and a maternal granddaughter of the Triumvir Crassus.  Atticus and Pilia were married in 58/56 BC, when Atticus was already 53/54 years old, and she died after 12 years of happy marriage.  She bore him a daughter, Attica, who became the first wife of Marcus Vipsanius Agrippa.

Death 

Atticus lived out the remainder of his life in Rome. Just after his 77th birthday he fell ill, and at first his ailment appeared minor. But after three months his health suddenly deteriorated. Deciding to accelerate the inevitable, he abstained from ingesting any nourishment, starving himself to death, and dying on the fifth day of such fasting, "which was the 31st March, in the consulship of Cn. Domitius and C. Sosius", that is in the year 32 BC. He was buried at the family tomb located at the Fifth Mile of the Appian Way.

See also
Quintus Caecilius Epirota

Notes

References 

 Most of this information is derived from the Excellentium Imperatorum Vitae and Attalus.org Life of Atticus of Cornelius Nepos, to which biographies of Cato and Atticus (discovered in a manuscript of Cicero's letters) were added by Peter Cornerus in the reign of Theodosius I.
 Anthony Everitt, Cicero, Random House, 2001.

Further reading 
 F. Münzer, "Atticus als Geschichtschreiber", Hermes, 40 (1905), pp. 50–100

External links

 

110s BC births
32 BC deaths
1st-century BC Romans
Adult adoptees
Ancient Roman adoptees
Ancient Roman bankers
Ancient Roman equites
Ancient Romans who committed suicide
Atticus, Titus Pomponius
Correspondents of Cicero
Philosophers of Roman Italy
Atticus, Titus
Roman-era Epicurean philosophers
Roman-era students in Athens
Suicides by starvation